Emmett R. "Abe" Stuber (November 12, 1903 – November 20, 1989) was an American football player and coach of football and basketball. He served as the head football coach at Westminster College in Fulton, Missouri from 1929 to 1931, at Southeast Missouri State Teachers College—now known as Southeast Missouri State University—from 1932 to 1946, and at Iowa State University from 1947 to 1953, compiling a career college football coaching record of 114–87–11 He was also the head basketball coach at Southeast Missouri State from 1932 to 1935 and from 1943 to 1946, tallying a mark of 60–42. Stuber played college football as a quarterback at the University of Missouri. He worked as an assistant coach in the National Football League (NFL), with the Philadelphia Eagles in 1955, the Green Bay Packers in 1956, and the Chicago Cardinals in 1958, and later as the director of player personnel for the Cardinals, then located in St. Louis. He died on November 20, 1989 at this home in Cape Girardeau, Missouri.

Head coaching record

Football

References

External links
 

1903 births
1989 deaths
American football quarterbacks
Chicago Cardinals coaches
Iowa State Cyclones football coaches
Green Bay Packers coaches
Missouri Tigers football players
Philadelphia Eagles coaches
Southeast Missouri State Redhawks athletic directors
Southeast Missouri State Redhawks football coaches
Southeast Missouri State Redhawks men's basketball coaches
St. Louis Cardinals (football) executives
Washington Huskies football coaches
Westminster Blue Jays football coaches